Phile or Philes may refer to:

-phile, a suffix in the English language, derived from the Greek philia
Phile (politician), a magistrate in Ancient Greece
Phile, a misspelling of computer file, seen in BBS hacker culture
 Alexios Philes, Byzantine general
 Manuel Philes, Byzantine poet
 Theodore Philes, Byzantine governor